HMS Hector was a 74-gun third rate ship of the line of the Royal Navy, launched on 27 May 1774 at Deptford.

Career

On 9 May 1801 Hector, and  unsuccessfully chased the French corvette Heliopolis, which eluded them and slipped into Alexandria.

Because Hector served in the navy's Egyptian campaign (8 March to 8 September 1801), her officers and crew qualified for the clasp "Egypt" to the Naval General Service Medal that the Admiralty authorised in 1850 for all surviving claimants.

Fate

Hector was converted for use as a prison ship in 1808, and was broken up in 1816.

Notes, citations, and references
Notes;

Citations;

References

Lavery, Brian (2003) The Ship of the Line - Volume 1: The development of the battlefleet 1650-1850. Conway Maritime Press. .

External links
 

Ships of the line of the Royal Navy
Royal Oak-class ships of the line
1774 ships